Buxus harlandii, the Harland boxwood, is a species of flowering plant in the family Buxaceae. It is native to coastal southeast China, from Hong Kong and other Guangdong islands down to Hainan, and to Vietnam. Care must be taken when purchasing, as many specimens labeled Buxus harlandii are actually Buxus microphylla.

References

harlandii
Plants used in bonsai
Flora of Southeast China
Flora of Hainan
Flora of Vietnam
Plants described in 1872